The 1973 Pro Bowl was the NFL's 23rd annual all-star game, which featured the outstanding performers from the  season. The game was played on Sunday, January 21, 1973, at Texas Stadium in Irving, Texas. It was the first Pro Bowl not to be played at the Los Angeles Memorial Coliseum.
The final score was AFC 33, NFC 28. Running back O. J. Simpson of the Buffalo Bills was named the game's Most Valuable Player.

Attendance at the game was 47,879. Chuck Noll of the Pittsburgh Steelers coached the AFC while the NFC was led by the Dallas Cowboys' Tom Landry. The game's referee was Dick Jorgensen.

Players on the winning AFC team received $2,000 each, while the NFC participants took home $1,500.

AFC roster

Offense

Defense

Special teams

NFC roster

Offense

Defense

Special teams

References

External links

Pro Bowl
Pro Bowl
Pro Bowl
Pro Bowl
American football in the Dallas–Fort Worth metroplex
Sports in Irving, Texas
January 1973 sports events in the United States